Operas based on the Orphean myths, and especially the story of Orpheus' journey to the underworld to rescue his wife, Eurydice, were amongst the earliest examples of the art form and continue to be written into the 21st century. Orpheus, the Greek hero whose songs could charm both gods and wild beasts and coax the trees and rocks into dance, has achieved an emblematic status as a metaphor for the power of music. The following is an annotated list of operas (and works in related genres) based on his myth. The works are listed with their composers and arranged by date of first performance. In cases where the opera was never performed, the approximate date of composition is given.

17th century

1600 – Jacopo Peri – Euridice, the first genuine opera whose music survives to this day.
1602 – Giulio Caccini – Euridice
1607 – Claudio Monteverdi – Monteverdi's L'Orfeo, widely regarded as the first operatic masterwork.
1616 – Domenico Belli's Orfeo dolente, a set of intermedi presented between the acts of Tasso's Aminta
1619 – Stefano Landi – La morte d'Orfeo
1638 – Heinrich Schütz – Orpheus und Euridice (music lost)
1647 – Luigi Rossi – Orfeo, one of the first operas to be performed in France. Rossi's own wife died while he was composing the score.
1654 – Carlo d'Aquino – Orfeo
1659 – Johann Jakob Löwe von Eisenach – Orpheus von Thracien
1672 – Antonio Sartorio – Orfeo
1673 – Matthew Locke – Orpheus and Euridice, a masque presented between the acts of Elkanah Settle's The Empress of Morocco
1676 – Giuseppe di Dia – Orfeo
1677 – Francesco della Torre – Orfeo
1683 – Johann Philipp Krieger – Orpheus und Eurydice
1683 – Antonio Draghi – La lira d'Orfeo
c 1685 – Marc-Antoine Charpentier – La descente d'Orphée aux enfers H 488
1689 – Bernardo Sabadini – Orfeo
1690 – Louis Lully – Orphée
1698 – Reinhard Keiser – Die sterbende Eurydice oder Orpheus
1699 – André Campra – Orfeo nell'inferni, Italian-language intermedio of Le carnaval de Venise

18th century

1701 – John Weldon – Orpheus and Euridice
1715 – Johann Fux – Orfeo ed Euridice
1722 – Georg Caspar Schürmann – Orpheus
1726 – Georg Philipp Telemann – Orpheus
1740 – John Frederick Lampe – Orpheus and Eurydice
c. 1740 – Jean-Philippe Rameau – (unfinished project)
1749 – Giovanni Alberto Ristori – I lamenti d'Orfeo
1750 – Georg Christoph Wagenseil – Euridice
1752 – Carl Heinrich Graun – Orfeo
1762 – Christoph Willibald Gluck – Orfeo ed Euridice (French version, Orphée et Euridice, 1774)
1767 – François-Hippolyte Barthélémon – The Burletta of Orpheus
1775 – Antonio Tozzi – Orfeo ed Euridice
1776 – Ferdinando Bertoni – Orfeo ed Euridice (to the same libretto as Gluck's more famous work)
1781 – Luigi Torelli – Orfeo
1785 – Friedrich Benda – Orpheus
1786 – Johann Gottlieb Naumann – Orpheus og Eurydice
1788 – Carl Ditters von Dittersdorf – Orpheus der Zweyte
1788 – Johann Friedrich Reichardt – Orpheus
1789 – Vittorio Trento – Orfeo negli Elisi1791 – Joseph Haydn – L'anima del filosofo, ossia Orfeo ed Euridice1791 – Ferdinando Paer – Orphée et Euridice1792 – Yevstigney Fomin – Орфей и Эвридика1792 – Peter Winter – Orpheus und Euridice1793 – Prosper-Didier Deshayes – Le petit Orphée (parody of Gluck's opera)
1796 – Luigi Lamberti – Orfeo1796 – Francesco Morolin – Orfeo ed Euridicec.1796, before 1797 – Antoine Dauvergne – Orphée (not performed)
1798 –  – Der Tod des Orpheus/Orpheus und Euridice19th century

1802 – Carl Conrad Cannabich – Orpheus1807 – Friedrich August Kanne – Orpheus1813 – Ferdinand Kauer – Orpheus und Euridice, oder So geht es im Olympus zu1814 – Marchese Francesco Sampieri – Orfeo (cantata?)
1858 – Jacques Offenbach – Orphée aux enfers1860 – Gustav Michaelis – Orpheus auf der Oberwelt1867 – Karl Ferdinand Konradin – Orpheus im Dorfe (operetta)

20th century

1907 – Fernando de Azevedo e Silva – A morte de Orfeu1907–16 – Claude Debussy – (unfinished project)
1913 – Jean Roger-Ducasse – Orphée, premiered at the Palais Garnier in a production mounted by Ida Rubinstein.
1925 – Gian Francesco Malipiero – L'Orfeide, cycle in three parts: I. La morte delle maschere, II. Sette canzoni, III. Orfeo1925 – Darius Milhaud – Les malheurs d'Orphée, chamber opera with a libretto by Armand Lunel
1926 – Ernst Krenek – Orpheus und Eurydike1932 – Alfredo Casella – La favola d'Orfeo, chamber opera after Poliziano's L'Orfeo1951 – Pierre Schaeffer – Orphée 511953 – Pierre Schaeffer, Pierre Henry – Orphée 531978 – Tito Schipa Jr. – Orfeo 9, the first Italian rock opera
1978 – Hans Werner Henze – Orpheus (Viennese version 1986)
1986 – Harrison Birtwistle – The Mask of Orpheus1993 – Philip Glass – Orphée, chamber opera with a libretto adapted by the composer from Jean Cocteau's film of the same name
1996 – Lorenzo Ferrero – La nascita di Orfeo, musical action in one act, libretto by Lorenzo Ferrero and Dario Del Corno, premiered at the Teatro Filarmonico

21st century
2001 – Jonathan Dove – L'altra Euridice, a 30-minute opera in one act for baritone and ensemble, based on a story by Italo Calvino, which retells the Orphean myth from the perspective of Pluto, god of the underworld.
2009 – Harrison Birtwistle – The Corridor, a 48-minute chamber opera for two singers and small ensemble.
2014 – Christina Pluhar – Orfeo Chamán, a neo-Baroque operatic adaption of the Orpheus myth, featuring styles from Mexico, Venezuela and Bulgaria.
2015 – John Robertson – Orpheus, an hour-long masque in six scenes commissioned and performed by Rousse State Opera
2020 – Matthew Aucoin – Eurydice, a three-act opera in English with libretto by Sarah Ruhl based on her play of the same name, premiered at the Los Angeles Opera

References

Notes

Sources
Agnew, Vanessa, Enlightenment Orpheus: The Power of Music in Other Worlds, Oxford University Press, 2008, .
Rosand, Ellen, "Opera: III. Early opera, 1600–90", Grove Music Online, ed. L. Macy (accessed via subscription 27 April 2010)
Spencer, Neil, "Anais Mitchell: Hadestown", The Observer, 25 April 2010 (accessed 27 April 2010)
Sternfeld, Frederick W., "Orpheus", Grove Music Online'', ed. L. Macy (accessed via subscription 15 August 2007)
Whenham, John, Claudio Monteverdi, Orfeo, Cambridge University Press, 1986.

External links
 Reinhard Kapp, Chronological list of theatrical, musical, literary, and film works based on the Orpheus myth (in German)

 
Orphean